Alinea may refer to:

 Alinea (restaurant)  in Chicago 
 In several languages : an indenting or a pilcrow, from the Latin a linea, referring to  ¶ which indicates a new paragraph
 Alinea (lizard), a small genus of lizards